Dareial Corrione Franklin (born August 15, 1992) is an American professional basketball player who is currently playing for the Hamar of the Icelandic 1. deild karla.

Professional career
After going undrafted in the 2017 NBA draft, Franklin has agreed to a deal with the Danish team, Randers Cimbria, for the 2018–19 season. In his first ever professional game, he recorded 21 points and 4 rebounds in a 81–95 loss to Horsens IC. He followed up his performance with 19 points, 5 rebounds and 2 steals to notch their first victory for the season as they defeated the EBAA, 101–90.

In 2021, Franklin agreed to a deal with Hamar of the Icelandic second-tier 1. deild karla. In his first game with Hamar, Franklin recorded 26 points and 8 rebounds in a 71–86 losing effort to Álftanes.

References

External links
Dee Franklin at eurobasket.com
Dee Franklin at RealGM
Icelandic statistics at Icelandic Basketball Association

1992 births
Living people
American expatriate basketball people in Chile
American expatriate basketball people in Denmark
American expatriate basketball people in Iceland
American men's basketball players
Basketball players from Alabama
Hamar men's basketball players
Small forwards
Sportspeople from Birmingham, Alabama